The Liga Națională Finals Most Valuable Player (MVP) Award is an annual award that is given to the best player of a given Finals series of the Romanian Liga Națională.

Winners

References

Romanian awards
Basketball most valuable player awards
European basketball awards
MVP (Finals)